The Carpinteria Unified School District (CUSD) is a public school district that provides services to students in the Carpinteria Valley, with district boundaries reaching south to the Ventura County line and north to the community of Summerland, California. The district, serving approximately 2800 students in grades K-12, has seven schools – one comprehensive high school, one alternative high school, one middle school, and four elementary schools. Six of the seven schools are located within the Carpinteria city limits; one elementary school is located in Summerland.

As of the 2008/2009 school year, the district included:

 Aliso Elementary School
 Canalino Elementary School
 Carpinteria Family School
 Summerland School
 Carpinteria Middle School
 Carpinteria High School
 Rincon High School

References

External links 
 
 Aliso Elementary School 
 Canalino Elementary School
 Carpinteria Family School 
 Summerland School
 Carpinteria Middle School 
 Carpinteria High School
 Rincon High School

School districts in Santa Barbara County, California
Carpinteria, California
Summerland, California